Dyson Institute Village was built in 2019 on the outskirts of Malmesbury, Wiltshire, England, to provide on-campus student housing for the Dyson Institute of Engineering and Technology. The village was designed as a number of stacked studio apartment modules by London architects WilkinsonEyre, and modelled after Montreal's Habitat 67. The pods are constructed from cross-laminated timber (CLT) and each pod is wrapped in aluminium. A feature of the modular system is that each pod is connected to the others with only four bolts.

Design 
The pods which make up the village were designed for fast construction. Each pod was made from cross-laminated timber, and they were prefabricated. The outside of each pod is wrapped in aluminium. The units were manufactured in Scotland complete with furniture and electrical fittings, and then delivered to Hullavington Airfield (a nearby Dyson site) to be completed.

Originally WilkinsonEyre's director said they wanted to paint the structure, but James Dyson preferred wood interiors. The pods were inspired by the Habitat 67 housing development designed in Montreal, Canada, by Moshe Safdie. The developers hoped to inspire a feeling of community with the arrangement of the village. Visually the pods appear to be a combination of retro and future.

Each pod has a large front window facing the communal building called the Roundhouse, which has a cafe, a screening room and a gathering area. The pods are arranged in a semi-circle facing it. The architects stated that the Roundhouse was meant to be the central "social and education hub" of the campus. The pods were designed to be sustainable and healthy, with proper ventilation.

Engineering 
There are 63 pods and there is no steel structural support. The pods are arranged in heights of two and three stories. Several of the stacks feature a pod which is cantilevered out . Each pod measures . Every six pods share a kitchen, a laundry area and a storage area.

The cross-laminated timber (CLT) created a challenge, because of the natural differences in wood stiffness. Orthotropic plates were utilized to cross the timber in three directions for structural stability. Only four bolts connect each pod to the others. The four bolts can be installed by one worker in ten minutes.

The Village was engineered by London based structural engineers Atelier One.

See also
Brutalism
Metabolism (architecture)
Structuralism (architecture)

References

External links 
Dyson Village, SCIA User Contest 2020 – via YouTube
Dyson Village, Malmesbury – Design Engineering Workshop (structural engineers)

Buildings and structures completed in 2019
Buildings and structures in Wiltshire
Brutalist architecture in England
Malmesbury
University and college residential buildings